John Kipkemboi Kibowen (born 21 April 1969 in Changach, southern Keiyo District), is a Kenyan former long-distance runner who specialized in the 5000 metres and cross-country running.

Kibowen won the gold medal in the short race at the 1998 and 2000 IAAF World Cross Country Championships, and finished second in 2003. He won a bronze at the 2001 World Championships and a silver at the 2003 World Athletics Final, finished fourth at the 2003 World Championships and sixth at the 2004 Summer Olympics and the 2005 World Championships.

He won the Parelloop 10K in race in the Netherlands three times a row: 2003, 2004, 2005.

Kibowen is currently based at the PACE Sports Management training camp in Kaptagat.

References

External links
 
 

1969 births
Living people
Kenyan male middle-distance runners
Kenyan male long-distance runners
Olympic athletes of Kenya
Athletes (track and field) at the 2004 Summer Olympics
Commonwealth Games competitors for Kenya
Athletes (track and field) at the 1998 Commonwealth Games
World Athletics Championships athletes for Kenya
World Athletics Championships medalists
World Athletics Cross Country Championships winners
African Games bronze medalists for Kenya
African Games medalists in athletics (track and field)
Kenyan male cross country runners
Goodwill Games medalists in athletics
Athletes (track and field) at the 2003 All-Africa Games
Competitors at the 2001 Goodwill Games
20th-century Kenyan people
21st-century Kenyan people